Donauer is a German language habitational surname. Notable people with the name include:
 Andreas Donauer (1976), German producer, musician, composer, lyricist and educator
 Hans Donauer (c. 1521 – 1596), German Renaissance painter

References 

German-language surnames
German toponymic surnames
Surnames of Slovak origin